, stylized as JVCKENWOOD, is a Japanese multinational electronics company headquartered in Yokohama, Japan. It was formed from the merger of Victor Company of Japan, Ltd (JVC) and Kenwood Corporation on October 1, 2008. Upon creation, Haruo Kawahara of Kenwood was the holding company's chairman, while JVC President Kunihiko Sato was the company's president. JVCKenwood focuses on car and home electronics, wireless systems for the worldwide consumer electronics market, professional broadcast, CCTV and digital and analogue two-way radio equipment and systems.

History
On October 1, 2008, Victor Company of Japan, Ltd (JVC) and Kenwood Corporation signed an agreement to integrate their management through the establishment of a joint holding company (stock transfer). The joint holding company was named JVC Kenwood Holdings, Inc.

On Monday, May 31, 2010, JVC Kenwood announced that it would end camcorder production in Japan by March 2011 and shift production overseas to cut losses.

On August 1, 2011, JVC Kenwood Holdings, Inc. was renamed to JVCKenwood Corporation and an absorption-type merger was finalized for the JVC and Kenwood subsidiaries, which occurred two months later. The absorption merger ended the separated operation of two companies.

On March 25, 2014, JVCKenwood acquired 100% ownership of EF Johnson Technologies, in order to "increase its P25 North American public safety and professional LMR system market share". EF Johnson became a wholly owned subsidiary.

On December 10, 2018, JVCKenwood acquired 40% ownership of Tait Communications.

Units

Brands
 JVC – consists of audio equipment, cameras, medical monitors, security utilities and projectors. Known for producing the first television for the Japanese market in 1939 and developed the video home system (VHS) in the early 1970s.
 Kenwood – consists of in-car devices, hi-fi home and personal audio equipment, professional two-way radio communication equipment, as well as the amateur radio equipment.
 Victor – consists of audio equipment for the high-end segment.

Subsidiaries
 EF Johnson Technologies – Multi-band portable radio company.
 Victor Entertainment – distributes music, movies, and other entertainment products.

References

External links

 

 
Mizuho Financial Group
Fuyo Group
Amateur radio companies
Audio amplifier manufacturers
Display technology companies
Portable audio player manufacturers
Headphones manufacturers
In-car entertainment
Loudspeaker manufacturers
Microphone manufacturers
Movie camera manufacturers
Navigation system companies
Audio equipment manufacturers of Japan
Video equipment manufacturers
Manufacturing companies based in Yokohama
Companies listed on the Tokyo Stock Exchange
Electronics companies of Japan
Japanese companies established in 2008
Electronics companies established in 2008
Holding companies established in 2008
Holding companies of Japan
Multinational companies headquartered in Japan
Radio manufacturers